"Excuse Me Miss" is a song by American rapper Jay-Z. It released on February 4, 2003, as a single for his seventh studio album The Blueprint 2: The Gift & the Curse (2002). It was also written alongside producers the Neptunes, whose Pharrell Williams sings the hook in falsetto voice (uncredited). The lyrics refer to love at first sight. It contains a more mature sound in comparison of his previous songs about women such as "Girls, Girls, Girls" and "I Just Wanna Love U (Give It 2 Me)".  The song samples Prince's 1990 song "Walk Don't Walk," the 2001 hit, "Take You Out" by Luther Vandross as well as "Big Poppa" by the Notorious B.I.G.

"Excuse Me Miss" was the third and final single from The Blueprint 2: The Gift & the Curse and was successful commercially. It peaked at #8 on the Billboard Hot 100  and #1 on the Billboard R&B chart in April, and was nominated for Best Rap Song at the 46th Grammy Awards but lost to Eminem's "Lose Yourself". The music video for the single was released in early February 2003.

The sequel to "Excuse Me Miss" was "La-La-La (Excuse Me Miss Again)" with a noticeably darker beat and lyrics, and was also produced by the Neptunes. The song was later was re-released with  "Stop" as a single for 2003's The Blueprint 2.1.

Music video
The music video was filmed in New York and New Jersey in January 2003. It was directed by Little X and produced by Ericka Danko. It stars Jay-Z and Jeannette Chaves. The video also features cameo appearances from State Property, who appears in the scenes at the nightclub with Jay-Z, and DJ Clue?, who is seen on the dancefloor. In the storyline, the two end up in an elevator alone and catch each other's eye. Jay-Z then has a premonition of their relationship and entertaining her with his lavish lifestyle. At the end of the video, Jay-Z approaches her.

Chaves won Sexiest Video Vixen at the inaugural Vibe Awards.

Formats and track listings

Excuse Me Miss – United States CD, vinyl 12"
A1 Excuse Me Miss (Radio) (4:18)
A2 Excuse Me Miss (Explicit) (4:41)
A3 Excuse Me Miss (Instrumental) (4:40)
B1 The Bounce (Clean) (featuring Kanye West) (4:18)
B2 F**k All Nite – Album Version (Clean) (4:19)

Excuse Me Miss / The Bounce – United States 12 '' vinyl
A1 Excuse Me Miss (Radio)
A2 Excuse Me Miss (LP Version)
A3 Excuse Me Miss (Instrumental)
B1 The Bounce (Radio) (featuring Kanye West)
B2 The Bounce (LP Version) (featuring Kanye West)
B3 The Bounce (Instrumental) (featuring Kanye West)

Excuse Me Miss – United Kingdom CD single
 "Excuse Me Miss" (Radio Edit)
 "Heart of the City (Ain't No Love)" (Live)

Excuse Me Miss – United Kingdom 12" vinyl
A1 Excuse Me Miss (Album Version – Explicit) (4:41)
A2 Excuse Me Miss (Instrumental) (4:40)

Charts

Weekly charts

Year-end charts

Release history

Remix

A remix of the song was released featuring Kanye West, which ended up on West's 2006 mixtape Freshmen Adjustment 2.

See also
List of songs recorded by Jay-Z

References

2003 singles
Jay-Z songs
Music videos directed by Director X
Pharrell Williams songs
Kanye West songs
Song recordings produced by the Neptunes
Songs written by Pharrell Williams
Songs written by Chad Hugo
Songs written by Jay-Z
Contemporary R&B ballads
Torch songs